Nicola Marie Bolger (born 3 March 1993) is an Australian football player, who currently plays for Perth Glory in the Australian W-League. She previously played for Newcastle Jets from 2011 to 2012.

Club career

Sydney FC

Newcastle Jets

Return to Sydney FC

Perth Glory
In August 2017, Bolger joined Perth Glory.

Honours
Sydney FC
 W-League Premiership: 2009
 W-League Championship: 2009

References

External links
 Player page on Football Federation Australia website

1993 births
Living people
Australian women's soccer players
Soccer players from Sydney
Sydney FC (A-League Women) players
Newcastle Jets FC (A-League Women) players
Perth Glory FC (A-League Women) players
A-League Women players
2015 FIFA Women's World Cup players
Australia women's international soccer players
Women's association football midfielders